Locust Hill may refer to:

in Canada
Locust Hill, Ontario, a settlement in the eastern part of Markham, Ontario

in the United States

Locust Hill, Kentucky, an unincorporated community
Locust Hill, Missouri, an unincorporated community
Locust Hill (Brunswick, Missouri), listed on the NRHP in Chariton County, Missouri
Locust Hill, Virginia (disambiguation), multiple locations
Locust Hill (Hurt, Virginia), listed on the NRHP in Pittsylvania County, Virginia
Locust Hill (Leesburg, Virginia), a historic house, in Loudoun County
Locust Hill (Locust Dale, Virginia), listed on the NRHP in Madison County, Virginia
Locust Hill (Mechanicsville, Virginia), listed on the NRHP in Rockbridge County, Virginia

See also
Locust Hill Country Club in the suburbs of Rochester, New York